Aleksandra Samardžić (born 23 September 1997) is a Bosnian judoka.

She is the bronze medallist of the 2017 Judo Grand Slam Baku in the -70 kg category.

References

External links
 

1997 births
Living people
Bosnia and Herzegovina female judoka
Judoka at the 2014 Summer Youth Olympics
European Games competitors for Bosnia and Herzegovina
Judoka at the 2015 European Games
Judoka at the 2019 European Games
Competitors at the 2018 Mediterranean Games
Competitors at the 2022 Mediterranean Games
Mediterranean Games competitors for Bosnia and Herzegovina
Serbs of Bosnia and Herzegovina